Purna Bahadur Khadka is a Nepalese politician, belonging to the Nepali Congress currently serving as the member of the 2nd Federal Parliament of Nepal. In the 2022 Nepalese general election, he won the election from Surkhet 1 (constituency).

References

Living people
Nepal MPs 2022–present
Members of the 1st Nepalese Constituent Assembly
Nepali Congress politicians from Sudurpashchim Province
Nepal MPs 1991–1994
Nepal MPs 1994–1999
Nepal MPs 1999–2002
1956 births